This is a list of submissions to the 90th Academy Awards for Best Foreign Language Film. The Academy of Motion Picture Arts and Sciences (AMPAS) has invited the film industries of various countries to submit their best film for the Academy Award for Best Foreign Language Film every year since the award was created in 1956. The award is presented annually by the Academy to a feature-length motion picture produced outside the United States that contains primarily non-English dialogue. The Foreign Language Film Award Committee oversees the process and reviews all the submitted films.

The submitted motion pictures must be first released theatrically in their respective countries between 1 October 2016 and 30 September 2017.

The deadline for submissions was 2 October 2017, with the Academy announcing a list of eligible films on 5 October. A record total of 92 countries submitted a film, with six countries submitting a film for the first time. Haiti sent Ayiti Mon Amour, Honduras sent Morazán, Laos sent Dearest Sister, Mozambique sent The Train of Salt and Sugar, Senegal sent Félicité, and Syria sent Little Gandhi.

From the longlist, nine finalists were shortlisted in late 2017, with the final five nominees announced on 23 January 2018. Sebastián Lelio became the first Chilean director to win the award, for A Fantastic Woman.

Submissions

Notes
  Macedonia decided not to submit a film for consideration this year. According to the committee, two films were submitted to their consideration: Golden Five by Goran Trenchovski and When the Day Had No Name by Teona Strugar Mitevska. However, they found that neither of the submitted films fulfilled the aesthetic or narrative criteria to be the Macedonian Oscar nominee.
 Both Ghana and the United Arab Emirates were scheduled to submit a film for the first time, but neither country sent a film for consideration.

References

External links
 Official website of the Academy Awards

2016 in film
2017 in film
90